The Panchachuli (पंचाचुली) peaks are a group of five snow-capped Himalayan peaks lying at the end of the eastern Kumaon region, near the Dugtu village in Darma valley. They form the watershed between the Gori and the Darmaganga valleys. Panchachuli is also located on the Gori Ganga-Lassar Yankti divide. The first ascent of this range (Panchchuli 1) was done by an Indo-Tibetan Border Police (ITBP) team in 1972, via the Uttari Balati glacier, led by Major Hukam Singh.

The five peaks on the Panchchuli massif are numbered from northwest to southeast. The highest peak is Panchchuli II, which was first scaled by an Indo-Tibetan Border Police  expedition, led by Mahendra Singh, on 26 May 1973. One theory of the group's name is derived from the legendary Pandavas's "Five Chulis" (cooking hearths).

Five peaks of Panchachuli

Panchachuli-1 (6,355 m) 
The first ascent of this peak was done by an Indo-Tibetan Border Police (ITBP) team in 1972, via the Uttari Balati glacier, led by Major Hukam Singh.
The coordinates of this peak are  Latitude 30°13'12" and  Longitude 80° 25'12".

Panchachuli-2 (6,904 m) 
This is the highest peak in the group and the highest peak lying entirely in the Kumaon region. It was first climbed successfully by an Indo-Tibetan Border Police team, led by Mahendra Singh, on 26 May 1973. The team climbed from the Balati plateau and via the southwest ridge to the summit. The coordinates of the peak are Latitude 30°12'51" and Longitude  80°25'39".

Panchachuli-3 (6,312 m) 
Though this peak has been not climbed, there have been a few expeditions and attempts to do so. The first attempt was in 1996 via the Dakshini Balati Glacier on the Munsiyari side. This attempt ended after an accident and an avalanche occurred. The second attempt was done in 1998, by a large Indian Army expedition, led by Colonel Bhatt of the Engineer Corps of the Indian Army,  via the Duktu Glacier on the Dhauli Ganga river side. This too was not successful as the team summiting had an accident on the final approach ridge.

Other reports of a successful climb have not been independently verified.

The coordinates of this peak are Latitude 30°12'00" and Longitude  80°26'24".

Panchachuli-4 (6,334 m) 

The first ascent of this peak was made in 1995 by a New Zealand expedition led by John Nankervis. The expedition members who summited were; John Nankervis (Wellington), Peter Cammell (Auckland), John Cocks (Dunedin), and Nick Shearer (Oamaru). Peter Platts (Christchurch) assisted the expedition as far as Camp 2. The coordinates of this peak are Latitude 30°11'24" and Longitude  80°27'00".

Panchachuli-5 (6,437 m) 
The first ascent of this peak was made in 1992 by an Indo-British team jointly led by mountaineers Chris Bonington and Harish Kapadia from the South Ridge. Stephen Venables was one of the members of the team who successfully summited, but had an accident during his descent. A daring rescue operation by the Indian Air force helped evacuate him to safety.

The coordinates of this peak are Latitude 30°10'48" and Longitude 80°28'12".

Approaches to Pancha-Chuli 
 Eastern approach:   via the Sona Glacier and Meola Glacier, Darma Valley, Dharchula.
 Western approach:   through the Uttari Balati Glacier via Balati Plateau.

References

External links
The Himalayan Journal - Pach Chuli Group ascents

Geography of Pithoragarh district
Mountains of Uttarakhand
Six-thousanders of the Himalayas